Paul McCartney's Glastonbury Groove is a compilation album of some of Paul McCartney's favourite songs. It was released by Uncut in their 2004 issue on McCartney. The album was compiled by Paul himself.

Track listing
James Taylor - Mean Old Man (James Taylor)
Brian Wilson - God Only Knows [live] (Brian Wilson, Tony Asher)
Chinmaya Dunster & Vidroha Jamie - Chance Meeting (Chinmaya Dunster, Vidroha Jamie)
Nitin Sawhney - Sunset (Nitin Sawhney)
Nat King Cole - The Very Thought of You (Ray Noble)
Maria João Pires - Nocturne No. 2 in E Flat Major (Frédéric Chopin)
Colin Hay - Going Somewhere (Colin Hay)
Paul McCartney - Temporary Secretary [Radioslave mix] (Paul McCartney)
Steadman - Carried (Steadman)
The Julian Bream Consort - Galliard (Benjamin Britten)
George Harrison - Marwa Blues (George Harrison)
London Symphony Orchestra - Spiral (Paul McCartney)
Glenn Aitken - The Way (Glenn Aitken)
Donovan - Sunny Goodge Street (Donovan)
Fred Astaire - Cheek to Cheek (Irving Berlin)
Frank Sinatra - A Lovely Way to Spend an Evening (Jimmy McHugh, Harold Adamson)
Paul McCartney - Calico Skies (Paul McCartney)

External links
Something For the Weekend - Paul McCartney's Glastonbury Groove at JPGR

Compilation albums included with magazines
2004 compilation albums
Paul McCartney